Radvanovce is a village and municipality in Vranov nad Topľou District in the Prešov Region of eastern Slovakia.

History
In historical records the village was first mentioned in 1349.

Geography
The municipality lies at an altitude of 360 metres and covers an area of 4.806 km². It has a population of about 192 people.

External links
 
 
http://www.statistics.sk/mosmis/eng/run.html

Villages and municipalities in Vranov nad Topľou District